The Parkhurst apprentices, juveniles from a reformatory attached to Parkhurst Prison on the Isle of Wight,  were sentenced to "transportation beyond the seas" and transported to Australia and New Zealand between 1842 and 1852. Either before leaving England or on arrival at their destination, they were pardoned on the conditions that they be "apprenticed" to local employers, and that they not return to England during the term of their sentence. In the ten years between 1842 and 1852 nearly 1500 boys aged from twelve to eighteen were transported to Australia and New Zealand from Parkhurst Prison.

Parkhurst apprentices in Western Australia

Early in 1839, Governor of Western Australia John Hutt received from the Colonial Office a circular asking if the colony would be prepared to accept juvenile prisoners who had first been reformed in "penitentiaries especially adapted for the purpose of their education and reformation". After seeking comment from the Western Australian Agricultural Society, Hutt responded that "The Majority of the Community would not object to boys not above 15 years of age...." but that the labour market could not support more than 30 boys per year.

Between 1842 and 1849, Western Australia accepted 234 Parkhurst apprentices, all males aged between 10 and 21 years.  As Western Australia was not then a penal colony, contemporary documents scrupulously avoided referring to the youths as "convicts", and most historians have maintained the distinction.  An opposing view, held for example by Gill (2004), is that the Parkhurst apprentices were convicts, and that their apprenticeship constituted convict assignment.

John Schoales jun. (c. 1810 – 10 April 1847), son of John Schoales QC of Dublin. was appointed Guardian of the apprentices. He determined the allowance they were paid, holding it in trust until their 5-year indenture period was over. The Parkhurst Visitors insisted that names of the boys not be published in the Government Gazette, in order that they were not discriminated against. Schoales was succeeded as Guardian by Frederick Dirck Wittenoom (c. 1821–1863).

Parkhurst apprentices were employed by a broad cross-section of Western Australia's businessmen and officials, including many of the colony's ruling class.  Among the long list of Parkhurst apprentice employers were Governor Andrew Clarke, Frederick Irwin, George Fletcher Moore, Anthony O'Grady Lefroy, William Locke Brockman, Thomas Brown, George Walpole Leake, Walter Padbury, Stephen Stanley Parker, Rosendo Salvado Thomas Peel JR and George Shenton Sr.

The assimilation of Parkhurst apprentices played an important role in the later acceptance of convicts in Western Australia.

New Zealand
One hundred and twenty three Parkhurst apprentices were sent to the Colony of New Zealand in 1842 and 1843. These had not been invited to the convict-free colony, and were a great surprise when the first ship arrived. After the second ship, the colony successfully petitioned that no more would be sent.

South Australia
The Colony of South Australia was also asked to accept Parkhurst Boys, but resisted and none was sent there.

List of ships
List of ships that brought Parkhurst apprentices to Australia and New Zealand

References

Further reading
Gill, Andrew (1997) Forced labour for the west : Parkhurst convicts 'apprenticed' in Western Australia 1842–1851 Maylands, W.A. : Blatellae Books, 
Gill, Andrew (2004). Convict assignment in Western Australia: The Parkhurst 'Apprentices' 1842–1851. Blatellae Books, Maylands, Western Australia.  .
(revised edition)
Statham, Pamela (1981). Why Convicts I: An economic analysis of colonial attitudes to the introduction of convicts in Stannage, C. T. (ed) (1981), Studies in Western Australian History IV: Convictism in Western Australia, University of Western Australia.

Convictism in Western Australia
Colony of New Zealand
History of the Isle of Wight
English prisoners and detainees
Juvenile prisons in England
English children
Convictism in New South Wales
Convictism in Tasmania